Carex strigosa, the thin-spiked wood sedge, is a species of flowering plant in the genus Carex, native to Europe and the Caucasus region. Its diploid chromosome number is 2n=66.

References

strigosa
Plants described in 1778